Pseudagrion commoniae, the black sprite, is a species of damselfly in the family Coenagrionidae.

Distribution and status
This species is found in eastern Africa, from South Africa to Ethiopia.

Habitat
The black sprite is found in and near streams and rivers in wooded country.

References

External links

 Pseudagrion commoniae on African Dragonflies and Damselflies Online

Coenagrionidae
Insects described in 1902
Taxonomy articles created by Polbot